The tournament Most Outstanding Player is an annual award given out at the conclusion of the NCAA Division III Men's Ice Hockey Championship to the player to be judged the most outstanding. The award was first conferred in 1984 but was retired after the 1990 championship. The award was resurrected in 2009 and has been given out annually since (as of 2019).

As of 2020, only one player has won the award multiple times (B. J. O'Brian) who, coincidentally, is also the only player to win the award while not playing for the national champion. The 2020 and 2021 tournaments were cancelled due to the COVID-19 pandemic in the United States, as a result no tournament Most Outstanding Player was awarded.

Award winners

† Chris Panek was the Tournament MOP in 1987 but the award was rescinded when Plattsburgh State's appearance was vacated as a result of NCAA rules violations.* Player was not a member of the championship team.

Award Breakdown

References

+
Most Outstanding Player